CP Boötis is a yellow-white hued star in the northern constellation of Boötes. With a baseline apparent visual magnitude of 6.40, it is at or near the lower limit for visibility with the typical naked eye in good viewing conditions. It is moving further away with a heliocentric radial velocity of +5.9 km/s.

This is an F-type subgiant star with a stellar classification of F8 IVw, which indicates it has nearly consumed the hydrogen at its core and is now evolving into a giant star. It is a low amplitude Delta Scuti variable that varies by 0.02 magnitude. At the age of 1.7 billion years it is spinning with a projected rotational velocity of 5.7 km/s. The star has 1.77 times the mass of the Sun and is radiating 12 times the Sun's luminosity from its photosphere at an effective temperature of 6,276 K.

References

External links
 HR 5441

F-type subgiants
Delta Scuti variables

Boötes
Durchmusterung objects
127986
071168
5441
Bootis, CP